Jimmy Redfern (born 1 August 1952) is an English retired professional football midfielder.

In May 1977, Redfern moved to the Washington Diplomats of the North American Soccer League at the completion of the 1976–1977 English season.

In October 1977 he signed for Dundalk and scored on his debut.

Although he stayed at Oriel Park until March in January 1978, the Dips sold Redfern's contract to the Tulsa Roughnecks.

References

External links

NASL stats

1952 births
Living people
Bolton Wanderers F.C. players
Chester City F.C. players
English footballers
English expatriate footballers
English Football League players
Association football midfielders
North American Soccer League (1968–1984) players
People from Kirkby
Philadelphia Fury (1978–1980) players
Tulsa Roughnecks (1978–1984) players
Washington Diplomats (NASL) players
Dundalk F.C. players
League of Ireland players
English expatriate sportspeople in the United States
Expatriate soccer players in the United States